Alexander Ivanovich Dunaev was a Full Councillor of State and the 5th governor of Taganrog.

Governor of Taganrog
During Dunaev's governorship Alexander I of Russia and his spouse Yelizaveta Alexeevna stayed in Taganrog. Russian tsar renewed his decree granting the city 10% of all customs duties. In 1827, Alexander Dunaev opened Taganrog Theatre, which was the first theatre in the South of Russia.

Governors of Taganrog